The Hungarian Mint is a government owned mint that produces circulating coins for Hungary. As a private company the mint is wholly owned by the Hungarian National Bank and is the sole body responsible for minting coins of the Hungarian forint. As well as minting circulating coins for use domestic the mint also produces a range of commemorative coins and manufacturers medals.

History
The origin of the mint can be traced back to the foundation of the Kingdom of Hungary when under King Stephen I silver denar were minted bearing his name. The denar remained the leading denomination in the country for the next three centuries, alongside the Obolus.

References

Bibliography
 

Mints (currency)
Mints of Europe
Bullion dealers
Government-owned companies of Hungary
Hungarian brands
Manufacturing companies based in Budapest